Nix (or Nicks) is a surname of English origin, which initially indicated that the person so named was the child of a person named Nicholas, traditionally shortened to "Nick". It is therefore closely related to Nixon and Nickson, which are derived from "Nick's son", and also related to Nicholl and Nicholson, derived from another variation of Nicholas.

Notable people surnamed "Nix"

Entertainment
Bern Nix (1947–2017), an American jazz guitarist
Cranford Nix (1969–2002), an American guitarist, singer, and songwriter
Don Nix (born 1941), an American songwriter, composer, arranger, musician, and author
Garth Nix (born 1963), an Australian writer who specializes in children's and young adult fantasy novels
Lori Nix (born 1969), a photographer and printer based in Brooklyn, New York
Martha Nix Wade (born 1967), an American actress sometimes credited as "Martha Nix"
Rosie Nix Adams (1958–2003), an American singer-songwriter born "Rosie Nix"
Willie Nix (died 1991), Blues drummer active in Memphis, Tennessee in the 1940s and 1950s
Wendi Nix (born 1974), an American anchor and sports reporter for ESPN
The Nix brothers (Evan, born 1983, and Adam, born 1986), American film directors, producers, and musicians

Law and politics
Evett Dumas Nix (1861–1946), a United States Marshal in the late 19th century handling the jurisdiction that included the wild Oklahoma Territory
J. Kelly Nix (born 1934), Louisiana politician and businessman 
Randy Nix (born 1956), a Republican member of the Georgia House of Representatives
Robert N. C. Nix Sr. (1898–1987), the first African American to represent Pennsylvania in the House of Representatives
Robert N. C. Nix Jr., a Justice of the Pennsylvania Supreme Court from 1984 to 1996
Sheila Nix, an American political strategist, most recently serving as Chief of Staff to Jill Biden

Sports
Barry Nix, an English football (soccer) defender 
Charles Nix (1873–1956), a British sport shooter who competed at the 1908 Summer Olympics
Buddy Nix (born 1939), the former General Manager of the Buffalo Bills
Daishen Nix (born 2002), American basketball player
Derrick Nix (born 1990), an American professional basketball player
Doyle Nix (1933–2009), an American football defensive back
Dwayne Nix (born 1946), an American football tight end
Dyron Nix (1967–2013), American professional basketball player
Emery Nix (1919–2005), an American football quarterback
Jacob Nix (born 1996), an American amateur baseball player
Jayson Nix (born 1982), an American professional baseball player
John Nix (American football) (1976), a former American football defensive lineman
Kent Nix (born 1944), a former professional American football quarterback
Kyle Nix (born 1986), an Australian-born English footballer
Laynce Nix (born 1980), an American professional baseball outfielder
Louis Nix (1991–2021), an American football nose tackle
Lucas Nix (born 1989), an American football guard
Bo Nix (born 2000), an American football quarterback
Morgan Nix (born 1968), an Irish former Gaelic football player
Patrick Nix (born 1972), an American college football coach and former player
Peter Nix (born 1958), English footballer, father of Kyle Nix
Matt Nix (born 1971), an American writer, producer, and director best known for creating Burn Notice
Roosevelt Nix (born 1967), American football player
Sunder Nix (born 1961), a 1984 Summer Olympics gold medalist in the men's 4x400 meter relay
Tyrone Nix (born 1972), an American defensive coordinator for the Middle Tennessee football team

Other
Alexander Nix, former CEO of Cambridge Analytica
Alison Nix (born 1988), an American fashion model
James R. Nix, director of the Ellen G. White Estate since 2000
Kirksey Nix, reputedly the leader of the Dixie Mafia
Orville Nix (1911–1972), a witness to the assassination of U.S. President John F. Kennedy
Walter Nix, involved in a McDonald's scam calling dispute

Fictional
David Nix, a character in the 2015 Disney film Tomorrowland
Nix, an evil cult leader portrayed in the movie Lord of Illusions
Nix, a supporting character in the video game Infamous 2.

Notable people surnamed Nicks
Hakeem Nicks (born 1988), an American football wide receiver 
John Nicks (born 1929), figure skater
John I. Nicks (1822–1897), New York politician
Stevie Nicks (born 1948), singer-songwriter

See also

Nia (given name)
Nick (disambiguation)
Nix (disambiguation)
New York Knicks, basketball team

References

Surnames from given names
Surnames of English origin